Strašimir Dimitrov (1930—2001) was a Bulgarian professor in history and corresponding member of the Bulgarian Academy of Sciences.

External links 
 Bibliography of Strašimir Dimitrov

1930 births
2001 deaths
Corresponding Members of the Bulgarian Academy of Sciences